is a Japanese 4-panel manga written and illustrated by .  The series is a parody-spinoff of Hajime Isayama's popular Attack on Titan manga.  It was launched in both Japanese and English on Kodansha and DeNA's manga app Manga Box on December 4, 2013, and ran until December 31, 2014.

Kodansha USA announced its license to the series at New York Comic Con on October 10, 2015 and published it in English in 2016.

Volumes

References

External links
 

Attack on Titan
Comics spin-offs
Kodansha manga
Parody anime and manga
Shōnen manga
Yonkoma